The British Diving Championships - platform winners formerly the (Amateur Swimming Association (ASA) National Championships) are listed below.

The diving championships were part of the National Swimming Championships for 13 years until 1965 when it separated.

The championships were not held in 2021 due to the COVID-19 pandemic.

Platform champions

See also
British Swimming

References

Swimming in the United Kingdom
Diving in the United Kingdom